Joseph Louis François Bertrand (11 March 1822 – 5 April 1900) was a French mathematician who worked in the fields of number theory, differential geometry, probability theory, economics and thermodynamics.

Biography

Joseph Bertrand was the son of physician Alexandre Jacques François Bertrand and the brother of archaeologist Alexandre Bertrand. His father died when Joseph was only nine years old, but that did not stand in his way of learning and understanding algebraic and elementary geometric concepts, and he also could speak Latin fluently, all when he was of the same age of nine.
At eleven years old he attended the course of the École Polytechnique as an auditor (open courses). From age eleven to seventeen, he obtained two bachelor's degrees, a license and a PhD with a thesis on the mathematical theory of electricity and is admitted first to the 1839 entrance examination of the École Polytechnique. Bertrand was a professor at the École Polytechnique and Collège de France, and was a member of the Paris Academy of Sciences where he was its permanent secretary for twenty-six years.

He conjectured, in 1845, that there is at least one prime between n and 2n − 2 for every n > 3. Chebyshev proved this conjecture, now called Bertrand's postulate, in 1850. He was also famous for a paradox in the field of probability, now known as Bertrand's Paradox. There is another paradox in game theory that is named after him, called the Bertrand Paradox. In 1849, he was the first to define real numbers using what is now called a Dedekind cut.

Bertrand translated into French Carl Friedrich Gauss's work on the theory of errors and the method of least squares.

In the field of economics he reviewed the work on oligopoly theory, specifically the Cournot Competition Model (1838) of French mathematician Antoine Augustin Cournot. His Bertrand Competition Model (1883) argued that Cournot had reached a very misleading conclusion, and he reworked it using prices rather than quantities as the strategic variables, thus showing that the equilibrium price was simply the competitive price.

His book Thermodynamique points out in Chapter XII, that thermodynamic entropy and temperature are only defined for reversible processes. He was one of the first people to point this out.

In 1858 he was elected a foreign member of the Royal Swedish Academy of Sciences.

Works by Bertrand
 Traité de calcul différentiel et de calcul intégral (Paris : Gauthier-Villars, 1864–1870) (2 volumes treatise on calculus)
 Rapport sur les progrès les plus récents de l'analyse mathématique (Paris: Imprimerie Impériale, 1867) (report on recent progress in mathematical analysis)
 Traité d'arithmétique (L. Hachette, 1849) (arithmetics)
 Thermodynamique (Paris : Gauthier-Villars, 1887)
 Méthode des moindres carrés (Mallet-Bachelier, 1855) (translation of Gauss's work on least squares)
 Leçons sur la théorie mathématique de l'électricité / professées au Collège de France (Paris : Gauthier-Villars et fils, 1890)
 Calcul des probabilités  (Paris : Gauthier-Villars et fils, 1889)
 Arago et sa vie scientifique (Paris : J. Hetzel, 1865) (biography of Arago)
 Blaise Pascal (Paris : C. Lévy, 1891) (biography)
 Les fondateurs de l'astronomie moderne: Copernic, Tycho Brahé, Képler, Galilée, Newton (Paris: J. Hetzel, 1865) (biographies)

See also

 
 
 
 
 
 
 
 Bertrand curve

Further reading

References

External links

Bertrand, Joseph Louis Francois (1822–1900)
Joseph Louis François Bertrand
References for Joseph Bertrand
 Joseph Louis François Bertrand
 
 
 Author profile in the database zbMATH

1822 births
1900 deaths
Scientists from Paris
19th-century French mathematicians
19th-century French economists
Differential geometers
Number theorists
Probability theorists
Members of the Académie Française
Members of the French Academy of Sciences
Corresponding members of the Saint Petersburg Academy of Sciences
École Polytechnique alumni
Academic staff of the Collège de France
Foreign Members of the Royal Society
Members of the Royal Swedish Academy of Sciences
Honorary members of the Saint Petersburg Academy of Sciences
Lycée Saint-Louis alumni